The Birch Tree is a 1967 Yugoslav film directed by Ante Babaja.

The film won two Golden Arena awards at the 1967 Pula Film Festival, the Yugoslav national film awards, including Best Cinematography (Tomislav Pinter) and Best Actor (Bata Živojinović).

In 1999, a poll of Croatian film critics found it to be one of the best Croatian films ever made.

References

External links

The Birch Tree at Filmski-programi.hr 

Yugoslav drama films
1967 films
1967 drama films
Jadran Film films
Films directed by Ante Babaja
Films based on works by Croatian writers
Films set in Yugoslavia
Films set in Croatia